Come Together is an all-ages Australian music festival performed at Luna Park Sydney. Beginning in 2005, it was originally two separate events, one in April and one in September. In 2006, a two-day festival was held in June (on the Queen's Birthday Long Weekend), and the festival was again on the same long weekend in 2007. Originally limited to Australian performers, the festival was later expanded to include New Zealand performers and a small number of international acts.

The ticket price includes an unlimited rides pass and is for ages 13 and over.

Triple J and The Music have traditionally supported or presented the event alongside Luna Park Sydney.

From 2011 to 2013 the event changed to a one-day hip hop-centric event until 2014 when the event was cancelled one week before its 7 June date due to poor ticket sales.

Come Together 2015 has been announced for 6 and 7 June – returning to its original two-day format, reintroducing indie music to the Sunday. Triple J are supporting and The Music are presenting. Triple J Unearthed winners will open each day which feature all-Aussie line-ups of established and breaking acts.

Notable past line-ups

2005 - April
Little Birdy
Rocket Science
Gerling
Sarah Blasko
The Redsunband
The Mess Hall
The Presets
Machine Translations
Even
Youth Group

2005 - September
You Am I
Butterfingers
Dappled Cities Fly
78 Saab
Peabody
Screamfeeder
Bluebottle Kiss
Andy Clockwise
Bluejuice
+ more

2006
Augie March
Regurgiator
The Herd
Ratcat
Magic Dirt
The Mess Hall
The Panics
+ more

2007
Every Time I Die
Grinspoon
Shihad
Cog
Karnivool
Regular John
+ more

2008
The Vines
British India
Bridezilla
The Holidays
The Living End
Gyroscope
Birds of Tokyo
Children Collide
Dead Letter Circus
The Getaway Plan
Mammal
+ more

2009
Midnight Juggernauts
Bliss & Eso
Something With Numbers
Art vs Science
Wolf & Cub
Red Riders
Spod
Cloud Control
Philadelphia Gran Jury
+ more

2010
MM9
Bertie Blackman
Horrorshow
The Jezabels
Boy & Bear
The Snowdroppers
Ernest Ellis
+ more

2011
Drapht
Urthboy
Illy
The Tongue
+more

2012
360
Horrorshow
Hermitude
Koolism
Skryptcha
+more

2013
The Herd
Spit Syndicate
Allday
Jackie Onassis
Crochet Crooks
+more

2014... (cancelled)

2015

DAY 1
Seth Sentry
Thundamentals
Horrorshow
REMI
Coin Banks
Ivan Ooze

DAY 2
Ball Park Music
The Jungle Giants
SAFIA
Elizabeth Rose
Montaigne
Ecca Vandal

References

External links
 

Music festivals in Australia
June events
Music festivals established in 2005
2005 establishments in Australia
Music in Sydney